Gehuo is a Southern Loloish language of Yunnan, China. It is spoken in Baima Shangzhai 白马上寨村, Yingpan Township 营盘乡, Jinping County 金平县, Yunnan (Yang, et al. 2011). Their autonym is Hanni 含妮, whereas the neighboring Hani people refer to them as Gehuo 格活 (Yang, et al. 2011:9). The Gehuo are also found in parts of Lüchun County and Yuanyang County, Yunnan (Yang, et al. 2011:5-6).

Distribution
The Jinping County Ethnic Gazetteer (2013:89, 101) reports that Gehe 格合 (also Gehe 格河; Gehuo 格活; in Laomeng Township 老勐乡 their exonym is Angluo 昂珞 [not the same as the Angluo language which is also known as Gehe]) is spoken in Tongchang 铜厂, Yingpan 营盘, and Laomeng 老勐 townships, and comprised 2,563 households and 10,510 persons as of 2005.

References

Yang Liujin 杨六金; Guo Ji 郭级; Chen Wenying 陈文英. 2011. 国际哈尼/阿卡区域文化调查: 中国金平县营盘哈尼族格活人文化实录. Kunming: Yunnan People's Press 云南人民出版社. 

Southern Loloish languages
Languages of China